Stella Prince Stocker (3 April 1858 – 29 March 1925) was an American composer and choral conductor.

Life and career
Stella Prince was born in Jacksonville, Illinois, to parents Dr. David and Lucy Manning Chandler Prince. She graduated from the Conservatory of Music in Jacksonville and the University of Michigan in 1880 with a B.A. degree, and continued her studies at the Sorbonne in Paris. She studied piano with Xaver Scharwenka and counterpoint and composition with Bruno Oscar Klein in New York City, piano with Frau Gliemann in Dresden, and voice with Giovanni Shiglia. After completing her studies, she worked as a musician, composer and lecturer in Europe and America. She was considered an expert on American Indian music and culture.

Stocker married Samuel Marston Stocker, a Duluth physician, in 1885. The couple moved to Duluth, Minnesota, where Stella founded and directed the Duluth Cecilian Chorale society and had a son, Arthur, and a daughter, Clara. Stocker died in Jacksonville, Florida. A collection of her papers is housed at the University of Minnesota Library in Duluth.

Works
Stocker composed instrumental and choral works and also for theater. Selected works include:
Ganymeade, light opera in three acts (1902)
Evelyn, a Musical Fairy Tale (1908)
Sieur du Lhut Indian pantomime (1916)
Marvels of Manabush Indian pantomime
Beulah, Queen of Hearts operetta
Raoul operetta
Nectar Song for soprano and alto voices
Macaroni Song baritone solo
Song of the Novice

References

1858 births
1924 deaths
19th-century classical composers
20th-century classical composers
American women classical composers
American classical composers
American music educators
American women music educators
University of Michigan alumni
19th-century American composers
20th-century American women musicians
20th-century American composers
20th-century women composers
19th-century women composers
19th-century American women musicians